Mur-sur-Allier (literally Mur on Allier) is a commune in the Puy-de-Dôme department in Auvergne in central France. It was established on 1 January 2019 by merger of the former communes of Mezel (the seat) and Dallet.

Population

See also
Communes of the Puy-de-Dôme department

References

Communes of Puy-de-Dôme
States and territories established in 2019